Quem é Você? is a Brazilian telenovela produced and broadcast at the time of 18 hours by TV Globo, March 4 to September 6, 1996 in 159 chapters (episodes).

With argument and synopsis of Ivani Ribeiro and Solange Castro Neves, was written by Solange Castro Neves (replaced by Lauro César Muniz, with a collaboration of Isa Duboc, Rosane Lima, Aimar Labaki and Nelson Nadotti. With the direction of Herval Rossano, Flávio Colatrello, Luiz Henrique Rios, direction of production of Carlos Henrique Cerqueira Leite, produced by the nucleus of Herval Rossano.

It counted with Elizabeth Savalla, Alexandre Borges, Cecil Thiré, Luíza Tomé, Marcelo Serrado, Júlia Lemmertz, Jonas Bloch, Rita Guedes, Thiago Picchi, Mylla Christie, Pedro Brício, Francisco Cuoco and Cássia Kis Magro in the main roles.

Cast

References

External links

1996 Brazilian television series debuts
1996 Brazilian television series endings
1996 telenovelas
TV Globo telenovelas
Brazilian telenovelas
Portuguese-language telenovelas